The Nigerien Patriotic Movement (MPN-KIISHIN KASSA) is a political party in Niger.

History
The party was launched on 8 November 2015 by former minister Ibrahim Yacouba after he was expelled from the ruling Nigerien Party for Democracy and Socialism.

Yacouba was the party's presidential candidate in the 2016 general elections, but failed to advance to the second round. However, the MPN won five seats in the National Assembly.

References

External links
Official website

Political parties in Niger
Political parties established in 2015
2015 establishments in Niger